Gerónimo Castillón y Salas (1756–1835) was a Spanish bishop who was the last Grand Inquisitor of Spain.

Biography

Gerónimo Castillón y Salas was born in Lascellas-Ponzano on September 30, 1756, the second son of José Castillón y Campo and his wife Brígida Salas.

After he was ordained as a priest, he served in Monzón, before becoming priest in his home town of Ponzano in 1795.  He was schoolmaster at Huesca Cathedral from 1808 to 1815.

He became Bishop of Tarazona in 1815.  He became Grand Inquisitor of Spain in 1818, and in this capacity was the head of the Spanish Inquisition until its abolition in 1820. King Fernando VII had initially asked his confessor, the Canary Islands priest Cristóbal Bencomo y Rodríguez, take on the office, but he had refused it.

He died in Tarazona in 1835.

See also

References

1756 births
1835 deaths
Grand Inquisitors of Spain
18th-century Spanish clergy
19th-century Roman Catholic bishops in Spain
Bishops of Tarazona